Haploembia is a genus of webspinners in the family Oligotomidae. There are at least three described species in Haploembia. They are native to the Mediterranean, but have been observed in the Western united states, and are adventive elsewhere.

Species
These three species belong to the genus Haploembia:
 Haploembia palaui Stefani, 1955
 Haploembia solieri (Rambur, 1842)
 Haploembia tarsalis (Ross, 1940)

References

Further reading

External links

 

Embioptera